Chichimeco may refer to:
 Chichimeca Jonaz people, a contemporary ethnic group of Mexico
 Chichimeca Jonaz language, their language
 Chichimeca, a historic group of peoples of Mexico
 Chichimeco, the Spanish name for the Westo, a historic tribe of the eastern United States